The white market is the legal, official, authorized, or intended market for goods and services. The white market in some goods, such as adoption of children, has been criticized as being inefficient due to government regulation. In other instances, such as the sale of cannabis in the United States, there are both white and black markets due inconsistent laws between the different states and the federal government. 

It is distinct from the black market of illegally trafficked goods and the grey market, in which commodities are distributed through channels which, while legal, are unofficial, unauthorized, or unintended by the original manufacturer. It is also sometimes distinguished from the pink market of state-sanctioned, but immoral activities, such as wars of aggression, and the red market of immoral activities banned by the state.

See also
Black market
Clearnet
Counter-economics
Grey market
Informal sector
Surface web

References

Libertarian terms
Libertarian theory
Market (economics)
Free market